A dental drill or handpiece is a hand-held, mechanical instrument used to perform a variety of common dental procedures, including removing decay, polishing fillings, performing cosmetic dentistry, and altering prostheses.
The handpiece itself consists of internal mechanical components which initiate a rotational force and provide power to the cutting instrument, usually a dental burr. The type of apparatus used clinically will vary depending on the required function dictated by the dental procedure. It is common for a light source and cooling water-spray system to also be incorporated into certain handpieces; this improves visibility, accuracy and overall success of the procedure. The burrs are usually made of tungsten carbide or diamond.

High-speed handpiece 
High-speed handpieces work at cutting speeds over 180,000 rpm. They are technically categorised into air turbine and speed-increasing depending on their mechanisms. In a clinical setting, however, air turbine handpieces are most often referred to as "high-speeds". Handpieces have a chuck or collet, for holding a cutter, called a burr or bur.

Mechanisms

Power 

The turbine is powered by compressed air between 35 and 61 pounds per square inch (~2,4 to 4,2 bar), which passes up the centre of the instrument and rotates a Pelton wheel in the head of the handpiece.  The centre of the windmill (chuck) is surrounded by bearing housing, which holds a friction-grip burr firmly & centrally within the instrument. Inside the bearing housing are small, lubricated ball-bearings (stainless steel or ceramic) which allow the shank of the burr to rotate smoothly along a central axis with minimal friction. The complete rotor is fixed with O-Rings in the head of the high speed. The O-Rings allow the system to become perfect centric during the idle speed but allow a small movement of the rotor within the head.

Failure of the burr to run centrally causes a number of clinical defects: 
 The burr will judder; this will cause excessive, damaging vibrations leading to cracking and crazing in the material being cut. It is also an unpleasant experience for the patient.
 Eccentric cutting - this will result in irregular removal of the surface, meaning more tissue than necessary is removed.
 Decreased control - due to irregular cutting, it is more difficult for the dentist to control movements

Cooling 
The friction produced by high-speeds creates significant heat within the burr. It is therefore critical for high-speed handpieces to have an effective water-cooling system. The standard is a cooling water of minimum 50 ml/min that is delivered through 3 to 5 spray hole jets.

Illumination 
Many modern handpieces now have a light in close proximity to the burr. The light is directed at the cutting surface as to assist with intra-operative vision.

Older handpieces used a system of halogen bulbs and fibre-optic rods, however, there are a number of disadvantages to this system: halogen bulbs deteriorate with time and are expensive to replace, and fibre-optic rods fracture easily if dropped and deteriorate during repeated autoclaving cycles.

More modern handpieces now use LED systems. Advantages of LEDs include a longer working life, more intense light and minimal heat production.

Speed-increasing handpiece 
Electric motors cannot turn as fast as air turbines. To power a high-speed handpiece, gears are needed to increase the speed of an electric motor, often by a ratio of 1:5.
For this reason, electric handpieces are also called speed-increasing handpieces, working at cutting speeds over 180,000 rpm.
 Speed-increasing handpiece is driven by electrical motor, also known as micromotor.
 The power to the handpiece is provided by the micromotor.
 Within the handpiece is internal gearings which allow the friction grip burr to rotate at a constant speed independent of torque.
 Therefore, the power is provided by micromotor and internal gearings.

Torque 
 Torque is the ability of burr to continually rotate with the same speed and cut even when pressure is applied
 As the speed of a handpiece increases its torque subsequently decreases (slow-speed handpieces have high torque, whereas high-speed handpieces, like the air turbine system, have a low torque) 
 The free running speed of 1:5 speed-increasing handpiece is the same as its cutting speed, thus 40,000 motor speed x5= 200,000 rpm burr speed.
 Electrical motor maintains the 200,000 rpm speed and provides consistent power so torque will be maintained, depending on the electronic control parameters.

Comparison of high speed and speed increasing handpieces

Slow speed handpiece 
Slow speed handpieces work at a much slower rate that high speed and speed-increasing handpieces, and are usually driven by rotary vane motors, instead of air turbines.  They work at a speed between 600 and 25,000 rpm. The internal gearings are very similar to that of a speed-increasing handpiece. The main difference between the two is that slow speed has internal gearing and they can use both a latch grip burr and a friction grip burr.

Indications for use 
Generally used for operative procedures such as the removal of dental caries or for polishing enamel or restorative materials. Straight slow speed handpiece is generally indicated for the extra oral adjustment and polishing of acrylic and metals.

Speed decreasing handpiece 
Designed to work at slower speeds.

Indications for use 
The main indications for use include endodontic canal preparation, implant placement and prophylaxis.

Endodontic canal preparation 
Endodontic canals are prepared using a slow rotating file. It is imperative that torque is controlled in order to prevent endodontic file separation during use.

 Implant placement - In order to prevent heat damage to bone during implant placement speed decreasing handpiece is used.
 Prophylaxis - Prophylaxis with the use of speed decreasing handpiece ensures that less heat is produced and thus less risk of pulpal damage by heat transmission.

Dental burr 

A dental burr or bur is a type of cutter used in a handpiece.  The burrs are usually made of tungsten carbide or diamond.  The three parts of a burr are the head, the neck, and the shank.

The heads of some burrs (such as tungsten carbide burrs) contain the blades which remove material.  These blades may be positioned at different angles in order to change the property of the burr. More obtuse angles will produce a negative rake angle, which increases the strength and longevity of the burr.  More acute angles will produce a positive rake angle, which has a sharper blade, but which dulls more quickly.  The heads of other commonly used burrs are covered in a fine grit which has a similar cutting function to blades (e.g. high speed diamond burrs). Diamond burrs seem to give better control and tactile feedback then carbide burrs, due to the fact that the diamonds are always in contact with the milled tooth in comparison to the single blades of the carbide burrs.

There are various shapes of burrs that include round, inverted cone, straight fissure, tapered fissure, and pear-shaped burrs.  Additional cuts across the blades of burrs were added to increase cutting efficiency, but their benefit has been minimized with the advent of high-speed handpieces.  These extra cuts are called crosscuts.

Due to the wide array of different burrs, numbering systems to categorise burrs are used and include a US numbering system and a numbering system used by the International Organization for Standardization (ISO).

Dental burrs typically have shank diameters of either 1.6 mm (1/16 inches) or 2.35 mm (3/32 inches).

Maintenance
The instrument needs to be disinfected or sterilized after every usage to prevent infection during succeeding incisions. Due to the mechanical structure of the device, this must not be done with alcoholic disinfectant, as that would destroy the lubricants. Instead it has to be done in an autoclave after removing the drill, washing the instrument with water and lubricating it. The United States Food and Drug Administration classes burrs as "single-use devices", although they can be sterilised with proper procedures.

History

The Indus Valley civilization has yielded evidence of dentistry being practiced as far back as 7000 BC. This earliest form of dentistry involved curing tooth-related disorders with bow drills operated, perhaps, by skilled bead craftsmen. The reconstruction of this ancient form of dentistry showed that the methods used were reliable and effective. Cavities of 3.5 mm depth with concentric grooves indicate use of a drill tool. The age of the teeth has been estimated at 9000 years. In later times, mechanical hand drills were used. Like most hand drills, they were quite slow, with speeds of up to 15 rpm.  In 1864, British dentist George Fellows Harrington invented a clockwork dental drill named Erado.  The device was much faster than earlier drills, but also very noisy.  In 1868, American dentist George F. Green came up with a pneumatic dental drill powered by pedal-operated bellows.  James B. Morrison devised a pedal-powered burr drill in 1871. 

The first electric dental drill was patented in 1875 by Green, a development that revolutionized dentistry. By 1914, electric dental drills could reach speeds of up to 3000 rpm.  A second wave of rapid development occurred in the 1950s and 60s, including the development of the air turbine drill.

Contra-angle
The modern incarnation of the dental drill is the air turbine (or air rotor) contra-angle handpiece, where the  shaft of the rotary instrument is at an angle allowing it to reach less accessible areas of the mouth for dental work.  The contra-angle was invented by John Patrick Walsh (later knighted) and members of the staff of the Dominion Physical Laboratory (DPL) Wellington, New Zealand.  The first official application for a provisional patent for the handpiece was filed in October 1949. This handpiece was driven by compressed air. The patent was granted in November to John Patrick Walsh, who conceived the idea of the contra-angle air-turbine handpiece after he had used a small commercial-type air grinder as a straight handpiece.  Dr. John Borden developed it in America and it was first commercially manufactured and distributed by the DENTSPLY Company as the Borden Airotor in 1957. Borden Airotors soon were also manufactured by different other companies like KaVo Dental, which built their first one in 1959.

Current iterations can operate at up to 800,000 rpm, however, most common is a 400,000 rpm "high speed" handpiece for precision work complemented with a "low speed" handpiece operating at a speed that is dictated by a micromotor which creates the momentum (max up to 40,000 rpm) for applications requiring higher torque than a high-speed handpiece can deliver.

Alternatives

Starting in the 1990s, a number of alternatives to conventional rotary dental drills have been developed.  These include dental laser systems, air abrasion devices (devices that combine small abrasive particles with pressurized air, essentially miniature sand blasters), and dental treatments with ozone or silver diamine fluoride (SDF).

References

 MedTerms definition for Drill, dental
 "Dental drills - enemy of the people?" from the British Dental Association museum
 Australian Dental Journal:1 p59-62
 Dental History definition for Rotors, dental

Dental equipment